The castra of Bucium was a fort in the Roman province of Dacia in the 2nd and 3rd centuries AD. Its ruins are located in Bucium (commune Orăștioara de Sus, Romania).

See also
Dacian fortress of Bucium
List of castra

External links
Roman castra from Romania - Google Maps / Earth

Notes

Roman legionary fortresses in Romania
Ancient history of Transylvania
Historic monuments in Hunedoara County